Donald L. Shoultz (born August 2, 1936) was an American politician in the state of Iowa.

Shoultz was born in Muscatine, Iowa. He attended the University of Northern Iowa and University of Georgia and was a teacher. He served in the Iowa House of Representatives from 1983 to 2007, as a Democrat.

References

1936 births
Living people
People from Muscatine, Iowa
21st-century American politicians
University of Northern Iowa alumni
Democratic Party members of the Iowa House of Representatives
20th-century American educators
20th-century American politicians
Schoolteachers from Iowa